Stanley Simpson Turner (21 October 1926 – 28 April 1991) was an English footballer. A tough-tackling defender, he made 246 appearances (227 in the league, 18 in the FA Cup and 1 in the Coronation Cup) for Port Vale during one of the club's brightest periods. He helped the "Valiants" to win the Third Division North title and to reach the FA Cup semi-finals in 1953–54.

Career
Turner joined Port Vale in March 1949, making his debut a year later. He featured in six Third Division South games in 1950–51 under the stewardship of Gordon Hodgson. After Ivor Powell's brief reign at Vale Park, Turner established himself in the first team under Freddie Steele, playing 40 games in 1951–52. He featured 46 times in 1952–53, as the "Valiants" finished second in the Third Division North.

In 1953–54, he was part of the "Iron Curtain" defence – along with Ray King (goalkeeper), Tommy Cheadle, Reg Potts and Roy Sproson – that won the league title and reached the FA Cup semi-finals. He played 42 Second Division games in 1954–55, but was restricted to 28 appearances in 1955–56 due to a cartilage operation. He played just 29 games in 1956–57, and was transferred to Worcester City (Southern League) in July 1957 by new manager Norman Low. He later played for Burton Albion.

Style of play
Former teammate Roy Sproson said: "[he was] an immaculate reader of the game with a tremendous volley. But Stan was also neat around his feet and constructive although, by his very nature, he could frighten a winger to death." Former teammate Graham Barnett later recalled how Turner and fellow defender Reg Potts did not get along and refused to speak to each other despite playing alongside each other for eight years. Barnet also described Turner as having a 'take-no-prisoners' approach to dealing with opposition wingers.

Career statistics
Source:

Honours
Port Vale
Football League Third Division North: 1953–54

References

1926 births
1991 deaths
People from Bucknall, Staffordshire
Footballers from Stoke-on-Trent
English footballers
Association football defenders
Port Vale F.C. players
Worcester City F.C. players
Burton Albion F.C. players
English Football League players
Southern Football League players